Predators: Original Motion Picture Soundtrack is the official soundtrack album of the 2010 science fiction film Predators. It was composed by John Debney and released on July 5, 2010 via La-La Land Records. The score is completely orchestral and makes use of several themes from the first two films by Alan Silvestri. The main "Predator"-theme plays for the first time in the film when the Predators first appear. Later it is used at several points throughout the film.

Track listing
 "Free Fall" – 3:06
 "Single Shooter" – 2:07
 "This Is Hell" – 4:09
 "Cages / Trip-Wire" – 3:51
 "Not of This Earth" – 2:50
 “Hound Attack" – 4:08
 "We Run We Die" – 4:39
 "Predator Attack" – 1:46
 "Meet Mr. Black" – 1:14
 "They See Our Traps" – 2:25
 "Over Here" – 2:23
 "Smoke" – 2:37
 "Nikolai Blows" – 2:09
 "Stans’ Last Stand" – 1:48
 "Hanzo’s Last Stand" – 3:08
 "Leg Trap" – 2:22
 "Take Me to the Ship" – 2:04
 “Edwin and Isabelle Captured" – 1:33
 "Predator Fight, Royce Runs" – 3:14
 "Twisted Edwin / Royce Returns" – 3:25
 "She's Paralyzed" – 6:04
 "Royce vs. Predator" – 2:38
 "Let’s Get Off This Planet" – 3:00
 "Theme from Predator" – 1:45

Selected credits
Art Direction [Cd] – Mark Banning 
Engineer – Denis St. Amand 
Executive Producer [Executive Album Producer For La-la Land Records] – Matt Verboys 
Mastered By [Album Mastered By] – Patricia Sullivan 
Music By – John Debney 
Conducted By - Pete Anthony
Performed By - The Hollywood Studio Symphony
Producer [Album Produced By] – John Debney, MV Gerhard
Recorded By [Recordist] – Tim Lauber 
Recorded By, Mixed By [Digital Recording & Electronics Mixing By] – Erik Swanson 
Recorded By, Mixed By [Score Recorded And Mixed] – Shawn Murphy 
Score Editor [Music Editor] – Jeff Carson (3) 
℗ © 2010 Twentieth Century Fox Film Corporation

Instrumentation
Strings: 33 violins, 18 violas, 18 violoncellos, 10 double basses
Woodwinds: 4 flutes, 3 oboes, 3 clarinets, 3 bassoons
Brass: 7 French horns, 4 trumpets, 4 trombones, 2 tubas
Percussion: 6 players
2 harps, 2 keyboards

Reception

References

Action film soundtracks
2010 soundtrack albums
La-La Land Records soundtracks
Science fiction soundtracks
John Debney soundtracks
Predator (franchise)